Michael Haydn's Symphony No. 1 in C major, Perger 35, Sherman 1, MH 23, is believed to have been written in Vienna around 1759. It is not clear whether this is the first symphony Michael Haydn wrote.

It is scored for two oboes, two bassoons, two horns, two trumpets, timpani and strings, in four movements:

Allegro
Andante, in G major
Menuetto e Trio, both in F major
Presto

References
 A. Delarte, "A Quick Overview Of The Instrumental Music Of Michael Haydn", Bob's Poetry Magazine, November 2006: 32 - 33 
 Charles H. Sherman and T. Donley Thomas, Johann Michael Haydn (1737 - 1806), a chronological thematic catalogue of his works. Stuyvesant, New York: Pendragon Press (1993)
 C. Sherman, "Johann Michael Haydn" in The Symphony: Salzburg, Part 2, London: Garland Publishing (1982): lxiii

Symphony 01
Compositions in C major
1759 compositions